The Norfolk Island Regional Council is the local government body of Norfolk Island, an island territory of Australia in the south Pacific Ocean. It is subject to the state-level legislation of New South Wales.

History
Prior to July 2015, Norfolk Island was self-governed by the Norfolk Legislative Assembly. The Norfolk Island Regional Council was formally established on 1 July 2016 and, unlike most local government bodies in Australia, delivers many Commonwealth services to residents in addition to local-level services such as land planning and emergency management.

In December 2021, the elected council was dismissed and an administrator, Michael Colreavy, appointed until 2024, when local government elections in New South Wales are next due.

References

External links
 

Norfolk Island, Regional Council of